The 1913 Glamorgan County Council election was the ninth contest for seats on this local authority in south Wales. It was preceded by the 1910 election and followed, due to the First World War, by the 1919 election.

Overview of the Result
As in most parts of Wales, the Liberal Party was once again triumphant and won a majority of the seats. The Conservatives made some impact, as did the Labour Party, although in case of the latter there was no sign of a breakthrough.

Boundary Changes
There were no boundary changes at this election.

Contested Elections
49 of the 66 councilors were returned unopposed. Only a small number of those seats that were contested changed hands. In many areas, contests between Liberal and Labour candidates were avoided and the Progressive label widely adopted. The Conservatives gained two seats at Llandeilo Talybont and Llansamlet while Labour lost at both Cwmavon and Ystalyfera. This was counterbalanced by a Labour victory at Pontardawe.

Aberdare and Mountain Ash
All eight members were returned unopposed in the Aberdare Valley and no Labour candidates entered the fray.

Bridgend and Maesteg districts
There were a number of contested elections in this area.

Swansea, Pontardawe and Port Talbot districts
In these areas the Conservatives again performed well, mainly at the expense of the Liberals.

Results

Aberaman

Aberavon

Abercynon

Aberdare Town

Bargoed

Barry

Barry Dock

Blaengwawr

Bridgend
Randall was again returned unopposed, with the Liberals deciding not to oppose him.

Briton Ferry

Cadoxton

Caerphilly
Boundary Change. The previous Caerphilly division was divided.

Cilfynydd

Coedffranc

Coity

Cowbridge

Cwmavon

Cymmer

Dinas Powys

Dulais Valley

Ferndale

Gadlys

Garw Valley

Gelligaer

Glyncorrwg

Gower

Hengoed
In this new ward, long-serving alderman David Prosser was defeated.

Kibbor
Henry Lewis again returned after many years.

Llandaff
Robert Forrest held the seat comfortably.

Llandeilo Talybont

Llansamlet

Llantrisant

Llwydcoed

Llwynypia and Clydach
James Evans, grocer, elected following Richard Lewis's election as alderman in 1901, was returned unopposed.

Loughor and Penderry

Maesteg, Caerau and Nantyffyllon

Maesteg, East and West
This was a repeat of the contest three years previously with the same result.

Margam
Having run as an Independent in 1910, narrowly defeating the Labour candidate, the sitting member was returned as a Conservative.

Merthyr Vale

Morriston

Mountain Ash

Neath (North)

Neath (South)

Newcastle
T.J. Hughes, vice-chairman of the county council was returned unopposed.

Ogmore
The ward was renamed Porthcawl. In a close contest a prominent Liberal defeated the former Conservative councillor.

Ogmore Valley
Alderman William Llewellyn was again returned unopposed.

Oystermouth

Penarth North

Penarth South

Penrhiwceiber

Pentre
E.T. Davies, auctioneer, had been elected at a by-election following Elias Henry Davies's appointment as alderman in 1902. He was now returned unopposed.

Pontardawe

Porthcawl

Pontlottyn

Pontypridd

Penygraig
Penygraig appears to be a new ward.

Porth

Resolven

Sketty

Swansea Valley

Trealaw

Treforest

Treherbert
Enoch Davies, returned in 1901 following William Morgan's re-election as alderman, was elected unopposed.

Treorchy
Thomas Jones, Co-operative stores manager, was returned unopposed.

Trealaw and Tonypandy
D.W. Davies, the member since 1898, was returned unopposed for the second successive election.

Tylorstown and Ynyshir
Sitting councillor Dr T.H. Morris stood down to allow Alderman W.H. Mathias to be returned unopposed.

Vale of Neath

Ystalyfera

Ystrad
Clifford Cory, the member since 1892, was once again returned unopposed.

Election of Aldermen

In addition to the 66 councillors the council consisted of 22 county aldermen. Boundary changes following the secession of Merthyr kept the number of councillors at 66 through the creation of additional wards. The number of aldermen therefore remained unchanged.  Aldermen were elected by the council, and served a six-year term. Following the 1910 election, there were twelve Aldermanic vacancies rather than eleven owing to the resignation of John Davies, an alderman elected for a Merthyr ward.

The following aldermen were appointed by the newly elected council.

elected for six years
Thomas, W. M. David
G. h- Fleming, 
Rhys 11 airies, 
Dd. Hughes 
G. J. Hughes, 
W. Jones, 
J. Jordan, 
Rhys Llew- ellyn, 
W. Llewellyn, 
W. H. Matthews, 
W. M. Williams, and 
Rev. D. H. Williams.

elected for three years

By-Elections

The following by-elections were held following the election of aldermen.

References

Bibliography

1913
1913 Welsh local elections
1910s in Glamorgan